Avondale High School is a former high school located in unincorporated Dekalb County, Georgia, United States; a part of the DeKalb County School District, it was adjacent to, but not inside, the City of Avondale Estates. It closed in May 2011. Its former campus is now used exclusively by the DeKalb School of the Arts, a magnet school.

Its feeder schools were Avondale Middle, Avondale Elementary, Forest Hills Elementary, Knollwood Elementary, Midway Elementary, and Robert Shaw Elementary.

History
The school was constructed in 1954. The academic performance of the school declined by the 1990s. It was scheduled to close after May 20, 2011.

Athletics
Under the guidance of Head Coaches Calvin Ramsey (1951-1969) and Crawford Kennedy (1970-1988), the Avondale Blue Devils football team was one of the top programs in Georgia from the 1950s-1979.  Avondale won 11 region championships and 3 state championships (1958-tied with Thomasville, 1963, and 1976).  The Blue Devils were also state runners-up 4 times (1957, 1960, 1964, and 1971).  During this time, Avondale featured 61 players who were named to the All-State team.  In November 1978, The Atlanta Journal-Constitution cited Avondale as the winningest high school football team in Georgia for the previous 20 years (1958-1978 record 199-30-6 for a winning percentage of 85.96%).  However, during the 1990s and 2000s the football program had declined. But in the mid 2000s, the Lady Blue Devils basketball team brought the winning spirit back to Avondale and won the Class 3A State championship in 2006.

Notable alumni

Stacey Abrams
Erica Ash
Cliff Austin
Omar J. Dorsey
Leslie Abrams Gardner
Donald Glover
Dorian Missick
Kelsey Scott
Ray Stevens

References

External links
 
 

DeKalb County School District high schools
1954 establishments in Georgia (U.S. state)
2011 disestablishments in Georgia (U.S. state)
High schools in Georgia (U.S. state)
Former high schools in Georgia (U.S. state)
Educational institutions established in 1954
Educational institutions disestablished in 2011